Keke railway station is a station on the Chinese Qingzang Railway. Distance from Xining is 426 km.

See also

 Qingzang Railway
 List of stations on Qingzang railway

Railway stations in Qinghai
Stations on the Qinghai–Tibet Railway